Events in the year 2022 in Zambia

Incumbents

Events 

 24 March – The World Health Organization announces that a polio vaccination campaign will begin in Malawi, Mozambique, Tanzania, and Zambia.
 24 June – Zambia reports the first suspected cases of monkeypox.
 15 December – Police in Zambia arrest a truck driver alleged to have transported 27 Ethiopian migrants found dead on the outskirts of Lusaka on Sunday. The bodies were dumped in a farm.
 23 December – Zambia officially abolishes capital punishment.

Deaths

March
 11 March – Rupiah Banda, 85, 4th Republican President of Zambia

May
 3 May - Alexander Chikwanda, 83, Finance Minister of Zambia from 2011 to 2016.

Sports

 Zambia women's national football team Qualifies for the 2023 FIFA Women's World Cup for the first time.
Zambia national football team win the 2022 COSAFA Cup

References

 
2020s in Zambia
Years of the 21st century in Zambia
Zambia
Zambia